Bibas or Peppas is a Greek surname derived from the word παππάς or παπάς, and it means priest. the surname is used in Greece and various places in the Mediterranean, like Libya, Israel.

for Israel, the surname is exists in Jews families of Greek origin where migrated to it.

In Libya and due to the influence of Greek in the local dialect, someone nicknamed with this because of the similarity of his appearance to the "peppas" which is called for the Christian priests, thus it became a surname for extended families from him, residents in Janzur as well as in other places in Libya, also in Tunisia and Algeria.

Also exists in the United States for families of Greek origin.

People with the surname
Notable people with the surname include: 

 Christos Peppas
 Haim Bibas
 James Pipas, American virologist
 June Peppas
 Nicholas A. Peppas
 Stephanos Bibas
 Yehuda Bibas